Robert Gregg (1834–1897) was an Anglican archbishop

Other people known as Robert or Bob Gregg include:

Bob Gregg (1904–1991), English football player
Bob Gregg (footballer, born 1899) (1899–1955), Scottish football player
Robert Gregg (field hockey) (born 1954), American Olympic hockey player